The Oscar is a 1966 American drama film directed by Russell Rouse and starring Stephen Boyd, Elke Sommer, Milton Berle, Eleanor Parker, Joseph Cotten, Jill St. John, Tony Bennett, Edie Adams and Ernest Borgnine.

The Oscar features several real Oscar winners in its cast and crew: along with Edith Head (who would also be nominated, but not win, for The Oscar), the film features Best Actor winners Borgnine and Broderick Crawford; Best Supporting Actor winners Ed Begley, Walter Brennan (three wins), Frank Sinatra, and James Dunn; and cinematographer Joseph Ruttenberg. Also in the cast were Merle Oberon and Eleanor Parker, who had been nominated for Oscars but did not win.

Plot
As movie star Frankie Fane is about to hear if he won a best acting Oscar, his friend Hymie Kelly, sitting near Frankie during the ceremony, reminisces about Fane's struggle to the top, beginning as a spieler for his stripper girlfriend Laurel. After moving to New York City, Frankie dumps Laurel for a budding fashion designer, Kay Bergdahl, which leads to a chance meeting with talent scout Sophie Cantaro. Sophie arranges for him to be signed with agent "Kappy" Kapstetter and brings Frankie to Hollywood, where he quickly becomes a rising star.

At each turn, Fane is an unprincipled heel, using and hurting others and causing them to recoil from him. He impulsively persuades Kay to marry him in Tijuana, but treats her cruelly thereafter. Frankie buys expensive homes and cars while offending the studio chief, Regan, until his life goes into a tailspin when he suddenly becomes "box office poison". At his lowest ebb, he unexpectedly receives an Oscar nomination, which Kappy believes is the result of Fane's portrayal of a "man without morals", essentially portraying himself.

In order to ensure his victory, he secretly employs the services of a crooked private investigator, who leaks information intended to influence voters to sympathize with Fane and support his Oscar candidacy. Frankie doesn't care that the scandal smears the reputations of Hymie and Laurel. An enraged Hymie confronts him, telling how he married Laurel, who then died during an abortion while pregnant with a child fathered by Frankie. Also, the private eye Yale also blackmails Fane, who must desperately turn to Yale's ex-wife for help to keep his ruse from being exposed.

The moment of truth comes at the Academy Awards, as presenter Merle Oberon announces the winner. As she states the name "Frank", Fane rises, prepared to bolt to the stage; she then follows with "Sinatra". As Frank Sinatra moves towards the stage, Fane is left stunned and crestfallen, clapping his hands weakly, while everyone in the assemblage whom he has wronged enjoys the comeuppance delivered to this wholly self-absorbed, unfeeling individual.

Cast

 Stephen Boyd as Frankie Fane
 Elke Sommer as Kay Bergdahl
 Milton Berle as Kappy Kapstetter
 Eleanor Parker as Sophie Cantaro
 Joseph Cotten as Kenneth H. Regan
 Jill St. John as Laurel Scott
 Tony Bennett as Hymie Kelly
 Edie Adams as Trina Yale
 Ernest Borgnine as Barney Yale
 Ed Begley as Grobard
 Walter Brennan as Orrin C. Quentin
 Broderick Crawford as Sheriff
 James Dunn as Network Executive
 Edith Head as herself 
 Hedda Hopper as herself 
 Peter Lawford as Steve Marks
 Merle Oberon as herself
 Frank Sinatra as himself 
 Nancy Sinatra as herself 
 Jack Soo as Sam
 Jean Hale as Cheryl Barker
 Eddie Ryder as Mexican Marriage Broker
 Chris Alcaide as Ledbetter
 John Dennis as Sid 
 Peter Leeds as Bert
 John Holland as Stevens
 Jean Bartel as Secretary 
 John Crowther as Wally

Release

Broadcast 
The Oscar made its network television debut on February 12, 1969 on ABC's Wednesday Night Movie. ABC moved the film to 8:30 pm Eastern due to cancelling the comedy show Turn-On after only one episode. TBS later included The Oscar in a film series called "Bad Movies We Love".

It was released on DVD and Blu-ray by Kino Lorber on February 4, 2020.

Reception

Critical response
While the film is technically a drama, many consider it to be an unintentional campy comedy, with critics skewering the script and performances. Others consider it most likely to be a burlesque, given the stature of the actors involved (one of the few things critics liked about the film was Berle, a classic comedian in a dramatic role).

Bosley Crowther of The New York Times panned the film, writing, "Not only is this screen translation of a novel by Richard Sale about a cheapskate Hollywood actor who tries to bludgeon his way to an Academy Award a piece of expensive claptrap, loaded with harrowing clichés, but it also is shamelessly endorsed by the presence of some of the great and near great of Hollywood." Variety noted that the filmmakers "make handsome use of the Hollywood background as setting for a narrative some may accept as typical of the Oscar race and others may not accept at all." Philip K. Scheuer of the Los Angeles Times wrote that like executive producer Joseph E. Levine's earlier films, it "is filled with people who, if they are not mean and despicable, are just weak or fear-ridden. The picture's own weakness is that they are characters first and people second; their motivations do not so much proceed from inside themselves as from the written screenplay." Richard L. Coe of The Washington Post stated, "The Academy of Motion Picture Arts and Sciences must have been on an LSD kick when it allowed itself to be used for 'The Oscar' ... That the story is a sleazy slice of muck is bad enough but for those presumably in charge of 'Oscar's' public image in an image-conscious 'industry' to permit such an association is far worse. For not only is the 'hero' of this yarn a totally cardboard heel, there is no evident justification for his role to have been nominated." The Monthly Film Bulletin declared, "Acres of screaming dialogue and mountainous moral question-marks can in no way disguise the basic silliness of this exercise."

Tony Bennett never made another feature film (outside of some cameos as himself in later films), and later "won" the Golden Turkey Award for "Worst Performance by a Popular Singer". The Oscar also marked the near-endpoint of Clarence Greene and Russell Rouse's careers; they made just one more feature afterwards:  1967's The Caper of the Golden Bulls, which they respectively produced and directed, but did not write, and which had already begun production at the time The Oscar premiered.  For co-screenwriter Harlan Ellison, The Oscar was both the first and last produced feature screenplay he wrote in his over 60-year writing career.

Rotten Tomatoes stated:

"This attempt at showing up the seamy underside of the film industry is in itself a testament to the overblown excesses of Hollywood before the Easy Riders and Raging Bulls shook things up. But that doesn't mean the story of Frankie Fane, amoral gigolo who claws his way to the top of the A-list, isn't enormously entertaining. Seething, sleazy and sensational, it's constantly guffaw-worthy, not least for Tony Bennett's disastrous 
performance as Hymie, Fane's version of Entourage's Turtle, and a glittering parade of stars doing cameos of themselves."

Accolades

See also
List of American films of 1966
Oscar bait
Oscar season
For Your Consideration, 2006 mockumentary film with similar themes

References

External links
 
 
 

1966 films
1966 drama films
1960s English-language films
American drama films
Films about actors
Films about Hollywood, Los Angeles
Films based on American novels
Films directed by Russell Rouse
Embassy Pictures films
1960s American films